Carly Gullickson and María Emilia Salerni were the defending champions, but Gullickson decided not to participate this year. Salerni partnered with Marion Bartoli, but withdrew from their semifinal match against Līga Dekmeijere and Ashley Harkleroad.

Anastasia Rodionova and Elena Vesnina won the title, defeating Dekmeijere and Harkleroad 6–7(4–7), 6–4, 6–2 in the final.

Seeds

Draw

References
Main Draw

Challenge Bell
Tournoi de Québec
Can